Shah pirabad(also Romanized as Shah-e Pirabad ) is a village in Tashan-e Sharqi Rural District, Tashan District, Behbahan County, Khuzestan Province, Iran. At the 2006 census, its population was 81, in 17 families.

References 

Populated places in Behbahan County